Morsbach is a municipality in Oberbergischer Kreis, a district in North Rhine-Westphalia near the border of Rhineland-Palatinate in Germany. In 2015, Morsbach's population was 10,600. The central village, also named Morsbach, has a population of 3,400. With a number of buildings dating back to the 12th century, it is a popular spot for hikers and other nature lovers.

Geography
In 2015, its population was 10,600.

Subdivisions
The municipality (Gemeinde) is divided into 66 subdivisions (Ortsteile). In alphabetical order, they are:
Alzen, Amberg, Appenhagen
Berghausen, Birken, Birzel, Bitze, Böcklingen, Breitgen, Burg Volperhausen
Ellingen, Erblingen, Euelsloch, Eugenienthal
Flockenberg, Frankenthal
Hahn, Halle, Hammer, Heide, Hellerseifen, Herbertshagen, Holpe, Hülstert
Katzenbach, Kömpel, Korseifen
Ley, Lichtenberg, Lützelseifen
Neuhöfchen, Niederasbach, Niederdorf, Niederwarnsbach, Niederzielenbach
Oberasbach, Oberholpe, Oberwarnsbach, Oberzielenbach, Ölmühle, Ortseifen
Reinshagen, Rhein, Ritterseifen, Rolshagen, Rom, Rosengarten, Rossenbach
Schlechtingen, Seifen, Siedenberg, Solseifen, Springe, Steimelhagen, Stentenbach, Stockshöhe, Straßerhof, Strick
Überasbach, Überholz
Volperhausen
Wallerhausen, Wendershagen, Wittershagen
Zinshardt

History 

4000-1800 BC: First settlement in the region, dating back to the Neolithic Age. A stone hatchet and a fragment of a flint blade have been found.
800 AD: Morschbach is part of Charlemagne's Holy Roman Empire. The parish of Morsbach was administered by the court officials of Sayn.
895: Morsbach is first mentioned in Duplicate of an Archival Book of the Inhabitants of Bonn, Saint Cassius Parish, which also mentions the Oberberg communities. 
31 March 1131: Pope Innocent II mentions the Morsbach church.
1174: The counts along the Wupper received Windeck Castle from Earl Heinrich Raps of Thuringia as a gift.
c. 1500: A chapel is built in Holpe as a branch church of Morsbach.
1563: The counts of Sayn-Homburg authorize a Lutheran church. The parish of Morsbach remains Catholic, and the Lutheran parish is in Holpe.
1634: Morsbach becomes a fiefdom of Count Hermann von Hatzfeldt.
1661: The fiefdom is reclaimed by Philipp Wilhelm von Berg.
1795: During the War of the First Coalition, French forces cross the Rhine, seize the Duchy of Berg and camp in Morsbach.
1805: Prince-elector Maximilian Joseph von Pfalz-Zweibrücken forms an alliance with Napoleon and becomes the king of Bavaria.
1806: Berg becomes a grand duchy, with Joachim Murat (Napoleon's brother-in-law) its regent.
1932: Kreis Waldbröl and Gummersbach are combined to form Oberbergischer Kreis. Morsbach has about 5,300 inhabitants, and its borders have been nearly unchanged for centuries.
1946: Oberbergischer Kreis becomes part of North Rhine-Westphalia in West Germany.

Coat of arms
Morsbach's coat of arms was granted on August 14, 1937. The upper part is a lion (symbolic of the Counts of Berg), and the lower part is a marshy brook.

Population

Points of interest
 The Romanesque Saint Gertrud basilica, whose tower dates to the second half of the 12th century; other sections date to the first half of the 13th century.
 Castle Volperhausen
 The heritage-protected Morsbach station building. According to its preservation order, "The preservation of this building is of public interest because of its locally influenced design of the uniform Prussian station building type and also because of its special roof design."

Twin towns
 Großrosseln (state of Saarland, Germany)
 Milly-la-Forêt (département of Essonne, France)

References

Bibliography
 Christoph Buchen / Erwin Weber: Alt Morsbach. Die Gemeinde Morsbach in alten Bildern, Meinerzhagen 1981
 Morsbach. Chronik einer oberbergischen Gemeinde, hg. von der Gemeinde Morsbach, Meinerzhagen 1987
 1100 Jahre Morsbach. 895 - 1995, hg. von der Gemeinde Morsbach, Waldbröl 1995

External links

 Official site 

Oberbergischer Kreis